Chiara de Luca  is a French-Italian actress.

Biography
De Luca grew up in Italy, France and the United States and received a degree in dramatic arts from Tufts University in Boston.

She played a leading role in the film Facechasers directed by Gabriel Judet-Weinshel. The film won the Best Experimental Film Award at the Brooklyn International Film Festival in 2005.

De Luca has appeared in Girl on a Bicycle by director Jeremy Leven, played the role of Marie de Médicis in the French television drama  Ce Jour Là, Tout a Changé, and appeared as the student in the film Ever Since the World Ended with  Adam Savage.

She has also done work  at the Atlantic Theater Company in New York with William H. Macy and at the British American Drama Academy in Oxford with Henry Goodman and Fiona Shaw. De Luca speaks fluent English, Italian and French.

Filmography
 Girl on a Bicycle - Police woman (2013) 
  Vagabond Salon (2013) 
 Knife Fight - Julia (2012)
 Sport de filles (2011) 
  Son va et viens (short) (2011)
  Ce jour là, tout a changé - Marie de Medicis (TV series) (2009)
 Facechasers (short) (2005)
 Ever Since the World Ended - Student (2001)

References

External links

French film actresses
Italian film actresses
French television actresses
Italian television actresses
Living people
Tufts University School of Arts and Sciences alumni
Year of birth missing (living people)
Alumni of the British American Drama Academy